Saipan is the largest island of the Northern Mariana Islands, a commonwealth of the United States in the western Pacific Ocean. According to 2020 estimates by the United States Census Bureau, the population of Saipan was 43,385, a decline of 10% from its 2010 count of 48,220.

The legislative and executive branches of Commonwealth government are located in the village of Capitol Hill on the island while the judicial branch is headquartered in the village of Susupe. Since the entire island is organized as a single municipality, most publications designate Saipan as the Commonwealth's capital. 

As of 2023, Saipan's mayor is Ramon Camacho and the governor of the Northern Mariana Islands is Arnold Palacios.

History

Prehistory 
Traces of human settlements on Saipan have been found by archaeologists ranging over 4,000 years, including petroglyphs, ancient Latte Stones, and other artifacts pointing to cultural affinities with Melanesia and with similar stone monuments in Micronesia and Palau.

Spanish colonial period 
Saipan, together with Tinian, was possibly first sighted by Europeans by the Spanish expedition of Ferdinand Magellan, when it made a landing in the southern Marianas on 6 March 1521. It is likely Saipan was sighted by Gonzalo Gómez de Espinosa in 1522 on board of Spanish ship Trinidad, which he commanded after the death of Ferdinand Magellan in an attempt to reach Panama. This is likely to have occurred after the sighting of the Maug Islands between the end of August and the end of September 1522. 

Gonzalo de Vigo deserted in the Maugs from Gomez de Espinosa's Trinidad and during the next four years, living with the local indigenous Chamorro people, visited thirteen main islands in the Marianas and possibly Saipan among them. The first clear evidence of Europeans arriving to Saipan was by the Manila galleon Santa Margarita commanded by Juan Martínez de Guillistegui, that wrecked on the island in February 1600 and whose survivors stayed on it for two years, until 250 were rescued by the Santo Tomas and the Jesus María. 

The Spanish formally occupied the island in 1668, with the missionary expedition of Diego Luis de San Vitores who named it San José. After 1670, it became a port of call for Spanish and occasional English, Dutch and French ships as a supply station for food and water. The native population shrank dramatically due to European-introduced diseases and conflicts over land.  The survivors were forcibly relocated to Guam in 1720 for better control and assimilation. Under Spanish rule, the island was developed into ranches for raising cattle and pigs, which were used to provision Spanish galleons on their way to Mexico.

Around 1815, many Carolinians from Satawal settled Saipan during a period when the Chamorros were imprisoned on Guam, which resulted in a significant loss of land and rights for the Chamorro natives. The initial leader of this company was an individual named "Chief Aghurubw".

German colonial period 
After the Spanish–American War of 1898, Saipan was occupied by the United States. However, it was then sold by Spain to the German Empire in 1899. 

The island was administered by Germany as part of German New Guinea, but during the German period, there was no attempt to develop or settle the island, which remained under the control of its Spanish and mestizo landowners.

Japanese colonial period 

In 1914, during World War I, the island was captured by the Empire of Japan. Japan was awarded formal control of the island in 1919 by the League of Nations as a part of its mandated territory of the South Seas Mandate. Militarily and economically, Saipan was one of the most important islands in the mandate and became the center of subsequent Japanese settlement. Immigration began in the 1920s by ethnic Japanese, Taiwanese and Okinawans, who developed large-scale sugar plantations. The South Seas Development Company built sugar refineries and, under Japanese rule, extensive infrastructure development occurred, including the construction of port facilities, waterworks, power stations, paved roads and schools, along with entertainment facilities and Shinto shrines. By October 1943, Saipan had a civilian population of 29,348 Japanese settlers and 3,926 Chamorro and Carolinian Islanders.

World War II 

Japan considered Saipan to be part of the last line of defenses for the Japanese homeland, and thus had strongly committed to defending it. The Imperial Japanese Army and Imperial Japanese Navy garrisoned Saipan heavily from the late 1930s, building numerous coastal artillery batteries, shore defenses, underground fortifications and an airstrip. In mid-1944, nearly 30,000 troops were based on the island.

The Battle of Saipan, from 15 June to 9 July 1944, was one of the major campaigns of World War II. The United States Marine Corps and United States Army landed on the beaches of the south-western side of the island and, after more than three weeks in heavy fighting, captured the island from the Japanese. The battle cost the Americans 3,426 killed and 10,364 wounded. 

Of the estimated 30,000 Japanese defenders, only 921 were taken prisoner. The weapons used, and the tactics of close quarter fighting, also resulted in high civilian casualties. Some 20,000 Japanese civilians perished during the battle, including over 1,000 who jumped from "Suicide Cliff" and "Banzai Cliff" rather than be taken prisoner.

Seabees of the U.S. Navy also landed, to initiate construction projects. With the capture of Saipan, the American military was only  
from the Japanese home islands, which placed most Japanese cities within striking distance of United States' B-29 Superfortress bombers. The loss of Saipan was a heavy blow to both the military and civilian administration of Japanese Prime Minister Hideki Tōjō, who was forced to resign.

The wartime history is interpreted on Saipan at American Memorial Park and the Commonwealth of the Northern Mariana Islands Museum of History and Culture. After the war, nearly all of the surviving Japanese settlers were repatriated to Japan.

American trust territory period 

After World War II, Saipan became part of the Trust Territory of the Pacific Islands, administered by the United States. The island continued to be dominated by the United States military. Since 1978, the island has been a municipality of the Commonwealth of the Northern Mariana Islands. The military presence began to be replaced by tourism in the 1990s, but still plays an important role in the local economy.

Geography 

Saipan is the largest island in the Northern Mariana Islands.

The western side of the island is lined with sandy beaches and an offshore coral reef creates a large lagoon. The eastern shore is composed primarily of rugged rocky cliffs and a reef.

Unlike many of the mountains in the Mariana Islands, it is not an extinct volcano but is a limestone formation.

To the north of Mount Tapochau towards Banzai Cliff, is a ridge of hills. Mount Achugao, situated about 2 miles north, has been interpreted to be a remnant of a stratified composite volcanic cone whose Eocene center was not far north of the present peak.

Flora and fauna 
The flora of Saipan is predominantly limestone forest. Some developed areas on the island are covered with Leucaena leucocephala, also known as "tangan-tangan" trees, which were spread broadly sometime after World War II.

Tangan-Tangan trees were introduced, primarily, as an erosion-prevention mechanism, due to the decimation of the landscape brought on by WWII. Remaining native forest occurs in small isolated fragments on steep slopes at low elevations and highland conservation areas of the island. Coconuts, papayas, and Thai hot peppers – locally called "donni' såli" or "boonie peppers" – are among the fruits that grow wild. Mangoes, taro root, breadfruit (locally called "Lemai"), and bananas are a few of the many foods cultivated by local families and farmers.

Saipan is home to multiple endemic bird species. Among them: the Mariana fruit dove, white-throated ground dove, bridled white-eye, golden white-eye, Micronesian myzomela and the endangered Saipan reed warbler.

The island used to have a large population of giant African land snails, introduced either deliberately as a food source, or accidentally by shipping, which became an agricultural pest. In the last few decades, its numbers have been substantially controlled by an introduced flatworm, Platydemus manokwari.

Climate 
Saipan has a borderline tropical rainforest climate (Köppen Af)/tropical monsoon climate (Köppen Am), moderated by seasonal trade winds from the northeast from November to March, and easterly winds from May to October. There is little seasonal temperature variation, and Saipan has been cited by the Guinness Book of World Records as having the least fluctuating temperatures in the world. However, the temperature is affected by elevation; hence, the island shows considerable variations between the coastal and mountainous areas.

The drier season runs from December to June and the rainier season from July to November. Typhoon season runs from July to December, and Saipan, along with the rest of the Mariana Islands, is subject to at least one typhoon each year.

Music 
Music on Saipan can generally be broken down into three categories: local, mainland American, and Asian. Local consists of Chamorro, Carolinian, Micronesian Hawaiian Reggae and Palauan music, often with traditional dance for many occasions. Mainland American consists of much of the same music that can be found on U.S. radio. Asian consists of Japanese, Korean, Thai and Philippine music, among others. There are seven radio stations on Saipan, which play mainly popular and classic English-language songs as well as local and Philippine music.

Television 
Local television stations on Saipan are the following:
 KPPI-LP (ABC7), the ABC affiliate (simulcasts KTGM), which is owned by Sorensen Media Group.
 KSPN 2, which is owned by the Flame Tree Network.
 The Visitors Channel 3, which is owned by the Flame Tree Network.
 WSZE-TV 10, the NBC affiliate (repeats KUAM-TV in Guam), which is owned by Pacific Telestations.

Transportation 

Travel to and from the island is available from nine international airlines via Saipan International Airport. A ferry once operated between Saipan and Tinian but was halted in 2010, reportedly for maintenance, and was never reinstated. 

One of the island's two main thoroughfares, Beach Road, is located on the western coast of Saipan. At some parts of the road, the beach is only a few feet away. Flame trees and pine trees line the street. The street also connects more than six villages that lie on the western coast of the island. Middle Road is the island's largest road and runs through its central section. Like Beach Road, Middle Road connects several villages throughout the island. Several offices, shops, hotels, and residences lie on or nearby these highways. Middle Road is labeled "Chalan Pale Arnold" on maps, but very few people call it that. Aside from school buses, there is little to no public transportation on Saipan. Cars are the transportation of choice with motorcycles being the only other truly viable transportation method while bicycles are only viable in certain areas. Proper sidewalks are uncommon on the island with the majority located in Garapan and several at the corner turns of stoplights.

Villages and towns 

The island of Saipan has a total of 30 "official" villages. However, there are many sub-areas and neighborhoods located in certain villages such as Afetnas in San Antonio and Tapochau and I Denne in Capitol Hill. Those marked "SV:" are the sub-villages.

Economy 

Tourism had traditionally been a vital source of the island's revenue and economic activities. But in the 1980s, garment manufacturing became one of the main economic driving forces in Saipan when the U.S. government agreed that the CNMI would be exempted from certain federal minimum wage and immigration laws. While one result of these changes was an increase in hotels and tourism, the main consequence was that dozens of garment factories opened and clothing manufacturing became the island's chief economic force, employing thousands of foreign contract laborers (mostly young Chinese women) at low wages. The manufacturers could legally label these low cost garments "Made in the U.S.A." and the clothing shipped to the U.S. market was also exempt from U.S. tariffs. By 1998, the island's garment industry exported close to $1 billion worth of apparel products to the mainland. The working conditions and treatment experienced by employees in these factories were the subject of controversy and criticism.

When the General Agreement on Tariffs and Trade (GATT) expired in 2005, thus eliminating quotas on textile exports to the United States, Saipan's garment factories started closing one after the other. From a high of 34 garment factories in the late 1990s, By March 2007, 19 companies manufactured garments on Saipan. In addition to many foreign-owned and run companies, many well-known U.S. brands also operated garment factories in Saipan for much of the last three decades. Brands included Gap, Levi Strauss, Phillips-Van Heusen, Abercrombie & Fitch, L'Oreal subsidiary Ralph Lauren (Polo), Lord & Taylor, Tommy Hilfiger, and Walmart. By January 15, 2009, the island's last garment factory shuttered their doors. On November 28, 2009, the federal government took control of immigration to the Northern Mariana Islands.

More recently, casino gaming has come to Saipan with at least five casinos now operating on the island.  As of 2016, Imperial Pacific International Holdings, a Chinese company listed on the Hong Kong Stock Exchange (but majority owned by billionaire businesswoman Cui Lijie), which develops and operates casinos, hotels, and restaurants in CNMI, was reportedly the largest taxpayer in Saipan. In 2014, Imperial Pacific was granted a 25-year license to build and operate casinos on Saipan with an option to extend the license for another 15 years. The Imperial Pacific Resort, still unfinished as of June 2019, is set to include a luxury hotel, casino, restaurants, retail space, and leisure facilities. The complex was supposed to be completed by August 2018. The existing casinos are already handling over $2 billion monthly in VIP bets, more than the largest casinos in Macau, leading to accusations of money laundering. There has been criticism by local doctors after dead and seriously injured Chinese workers have appeared at the hospital, often illegally working under tourist visas.

Labor controversies

Jack Abramoff CNMI scandal 

Jack Abramoff and his law firm were paid at least $6.7 million by the Commonwealth of the Northern Mariana Islands (CNMI) from 1995 to 2001 to change and/or prevent Congressional action regarding the Commonwealth of the Northern Mariana Islands (CNMI) and businesses on Saipan, its capital, commercial center, and one of its three principal islands.

Later lobbying efforts involved mailings from a Ralph Reed marketing company and bribery of Roger Stillwell, a Department of the Interior official who in 2006 pleaded guilty to accepting gifts from Abramoff.

Foreign contract labor abuse and exemptions from U.S. federal regulations 

Excerpted from "Immigration and the CNMI: A report of the US Commission on Immigration Reform", January 7, 1998:

On March 31, 1998, US Senator Daniel Akaka said:

In 1991, Levi Strauss & Co. was embarrassed by a scandal involving six subsidiary factories run on Saipan by the Tan Holdings Corporation. It was revealed that Chinese laborers in those factories suffered under what the U.S. Department of Labor called "slavelike" conditions. Cited for sub-minimal wages, seven-day work week schedules with twelve-hour shifts, poor living conditions and other indignities (including the alleged removal of passports and the virtual imprisonment of workers), Tan would eventually pay what was then the largest fines in U.S. labor history, distributing more than $9 million in restitution to some 1200 employees. At the time, Tan factories produced 3% of Levi's jeans with the "Made in the U.S.A." label. Levi Strauss claimed that it had no knowledge of the offenses, severed ties to the Tan family, and instituted labor reforms and inspection practices in its offshore facilities.

In 1999, Sweatshop Watch, Global Exchange, Asian Law Caucus, Unite, and the garment workers themselves filed three separate lawsuits in class-action suits on behalf of roughly 30,000 garment workers in Saipan. The defendants included 27 U.S. retailers and 23 Saipan garment factories. By 2004, they had won a 20 million dollar settlement against all but one of the defendants. Levi Strauss & Co. was the only successful defendant, winning the case against them in 2004.

In 2005–2006, the issue of immigration and labor practices on Saipan was brought up during the American political scandals of Congressman Tom DeLay and lobbyist Jack Abramoff, who visited the island on numerous occasions. Ms. magazine published an exposé in their Spring 2006 article "Paradise Lost: Greed, Sex Slavery, Forced Abortion and Right-Wing Moralists".

On February 8, 2007, the United States Senate Committee on Energy and Natural Resources received testimony  about federalizing CNMI labor and immigration.

On July 19, 2007, Deputy Assistant Secretary of Insular Affairs David B. Cohen testified before the Senate Committee on Energy and Natural Resources Regarding S. 1634 (The Northern Mariana Islands Covenant Implementation Act). He said:

A movement to federalize labor and immigration in the Northern Marianas Islands began in early 2007. A letter writing campaign to reform CNMI labor and immigration was debated in the local newspapers. Worker groups organized a successful Unity March December 7, 2007. Despite a strong lobby effort by Governor Fitial to stop it, President Bush signed PL 110-229 into law on May 8, 2008 and the U.S. immigration takeover began November 28, 2009.

Contract laborers arriving from China are usually required to pay their (Chinese National) recruitment agents fees equal to a year's total salary (roughly $3,500) and occasionally as high as two years' salary, though the contracts are only one-year contracts, renewable at the employer's discretion.

Sixty percent of the population of the CNMI is contract workers. These workers cannot vote. They are not represented, and can be deported if they lose their jobs. Meanwhile, the minimum wage remains well below that on the U.S. mainland, and abuses of vulnerable workers are commonplace.

In John Bowe's 2007 book Nobodies: Modern American Slave Labor and the Dark Side of the New Global Economy, he provides a focus on Saipan, exploring how its culture, isolation and American ties have made it a favorable environment for exploitative garment manufacturers and corrupt politicos. Bowe goes into detail about the island's factories, and also its karaoke bars and strip joints, some of which have had connections with politicos. The author depicts Saipan as a vulnerable, truly suffering community, where poverty rates have climbed as high as 35 percent, and proposes that the guest worker setup, by allowing many native islanders to avoid work, has actually crippled the competitiveness and job readiness of the native population.

Chinese national, Chun Yu Wang, in her 2009 book, Chicken Feathers and Garlic Skin: Diary of a Chinese Garment Factory Girl on Saipan (as told to Walt F.J. Goodridge), provides the only known first-hand account of factory work conditions and life in the barracks, a historical timeline of the garment factory era on Saipan, and provides revealing insights from a Chinese perspective into the experience typical of many of the garment factory workers on Saipan.

Imperial Pacific Holdings Casino 
On 23 March 2017, one of Imperial Pacific's Chinese construction workers fell off a scaffold and died. This led the Federal Bureau of Investigation to search one of Imperial Pacific's offices and make an arrest.  On 15 February 2018, Bloomberg Businessweek published an investigative report on the circumstances surrounding the death of this construction worker. An attorney for the Torres Brothers law firm which represented this worker said the report omitted several facts about the case. Imperial Pacific disputed all allegations of wrongdoing and sued Bloomberg for defamation. The Federal Bureau of Investigation and U.S. Department of Homeland Security investigated the case and charged five individuals with harboring undocumented workers. Companies linked to the governing Torres family have close links to the corporation, receiving $126,000 in 2017.

Other local issues 
As a result, several large hotels use reverse osmosis to produce fresh water for their customers. In addition, many homes and small businesses augment the sporadic and sometimes brackish water provided by CUC with rainwater collected and stored in cisterns. Most locals buy drinking water from water distributors and use tap water only for bathing or washing as it has a strong sulfur taste.

On October 18, 2018, Typhoon Yutu, the second strongest typhoon to have ever made impact on U.S. territory, made landfall on Saipan. With sustained winds of 130 mph and gusts up to 190 mph, it caused significant damage.

Demographics 

According to the 2010 United States Census, Saipan's population was 48,220, a drop of 22.7% from the 2000 US Census; the population decrease is largely attributed to working immigrants and their families either returning to their home countries after the collapse of the garment industry or moving to other locations with economic opportunities such as Guam and the United States mainland. The population of Saipan corresponds to approximately 90% of the population of the Northern Mariana Islands.

Large numbers of Filipino, Chinese, Bangladeshi, Nepalese and smaller numbers of Sri Lankan and Burmese unskilled workers and professionals migrated to the Northern Mariana Islands including Saipan during the late 1900s mostly during the 1980s and 1990s. In addition, a large percentage of the island's population includes first-generation immigrants and their descendants from Japan, China, Korea, the Philippines, Bangladesh and immigrants from other Micronesian islands.

According to the 2010 United States Census, Saipan was 50.9% Asian (35.3% Filipino, 6.8% Chinese, 4.2% Korean, 1.5% Japanese, 0.9% Bangladeshi, 0.5% Thai, 0.4% Nepalese, 0.3% Other Asian), 34.9% Pacific Islander (23.9% Chamorro, 4.6% Carolinian, 2.3% Chuukese, 2.2% Palauan, 0.8% Pohnpeian, 0.4% Yapese, 0.1% Kosraean, 0.1% Marshallese, and 0.5% Other Native Hawaiian and Other Pacific Islander), 2.1% White and 0.2% others.

Religion 

The majority of the native Chamorro and Carolinian population are Catholic. About half of the general population on the island are foreign contract workers, mainly Catholics of Filipino descent.

Numerous Christian churches are active in Saipan, providing services in various languages including English, Chamorro, Tagalog, Korean and Chinese.  

In conjunction to the rest of the Northern Mariana Islands, there are Chinese and Filipino Protestant and Catholic churches, a Korean Protestant church, three mosques for the Bangladeshi community and a Buddhist temple.

Education 

Commonwealth of the Northern Mariana Islands Public School System serves Saipan. Public high schools:
 Kagman High School (Kagman)
 Marianas High School (Susupe)
 Saipan Southern High School (Koblerville)

There are many private schools on Saipan, including:
 Brilliant Star Montessori School - Navy Hill
 Saipan International School – As Lito
 Mount Carmel School – Chalan Kanoa
 Grace Christian Academy – Navy Hill
 Marianas Baptist Academy – Dandan
 Saipan Community School (grades K-8) – A Protestant school, it was established in 1976. Prior to SCS no Protestant schools were in Saipan.
 Saipan Seventh-day Adventist School (18 months-grade 8) – the previous campus of the Calvary School in Chalan Kiya
Northern Marianas Academy (Fina Sisu).
 Whispering Palms School (grades K-8) – Navy Hill (closed)

Northern Marianas College is a two-year community college serving the Northern Mariana Islands. Eucon International College is a four-year college that offers degrees in Bible and Education.

Joeten-Kiyu Public Library (JKPL) of the State Library of the Commonwealth of the Northern Mariana Islands is in Susupe, Saipan.

Japanese Community School of Saipan (サイパン日本人補習校 Saipan Nihonjin Hoshūkō), a supplementary Japanese school operated by the Japanese Society of the Northern Marianas (北マリアナ日本人会) Educational Department, is in Saipan. Classes are on the second floor of the USL Building in Gualo Rai. It was established on November 5, 1983 (Shōwa 58).

 Public middle schools:
 Tanapag Middle School
 Hopwood Middle School
 Chacha Ocean View Middle School
 Francisco Mendiola Sablan Middle School
 Dandan Middle School
 Public elementary schools:
 Gregorio T. Camacho (GTC) Elementary School
 San Vicente Elementary School
 Koblerville Elementary School
 William S. Reyes Elementary School
 Kagman Elementary School
 Oleai Elementary School
 Garapan Elementary School

Notable people

From Saipan 

 Theresa H. Arriola
 Tina Stege
 Jayatirtha Dasa
 Colin Sinclair

From the mainland United States 
 Larry Hillblom: 1980s–1995
 William Millard: 1986–2011

Appearances in literature and media 

Saipan was a major part of the plot in the Tom Clancy novel Debt of Honor.

The 1960 movie Hell to Eternity tells the true-life story of GI Guy Gabaldon's role in convincing 800 Japanese soldiers to surrender during the WWII Battle of Saipan. Key to Gabaldon's success was his ability to speak Japanese fluently due to having been raised in the 1930s by a Japanese-American foster family.

Much of the action in the 2002 film Windtalkers takes place during the invasion of Saipan during World War II.

In 2011, a Japanese film about Captain Sakae Ōba took place in Saipan. Titled Oba: The Last Samurai, it revolved around Oba holding out on Saipan until December 1, 1945.

A significant part of the novel Amrita by Japanese author Banana Yoshimoto takes place in Saipan with regular references to the landscape and spirituality of the island.

Saipan is the setting for the P. F. Kluge novel The Master Blaster. This novel is structured as first-person narratives of five characters, four of whom arrive on the same flight, and the unfolding of their experiences on the island. The book weaves together a mysterious tale of historical fiction with reference to Saipan's multi-ethnic past, from Japanese colonization to American WWII victory and the post-Cold War evolution of the island. The Master Blaster is the home-grown anonymous critic who blogs about the corruption and exploitation by developers, politicians, and government officials.

Saipan is known in the association football community as the site of the training camp for the Republic of Ireland national football team prior to the 2002 FIFA World Cup in which an incident of heated argument occurred between then-captain Roy Keane and then-manager Mick McCarthy, which eventually led to the dismissal and departure of Keane from the squad. This incident has come to be known colloquially as "the Saipan incident" or "the Saipan saga".

In 2016, a horror film directed by Hiroshi Katagiri was released on Netflix titledGehenna: Where Death Lives in which American developers encounter a supernatural entity in a World War 2 hidden bunker while searching for land to build their resort.

See also 

 Birth tourism
 Commonwealth (U.S. insular area)
 Amelia Earhart § Speculation on disappearance
 Kalabera
 National Register of Historic Places listings in the Northern Mariana Islands
 List of populated places in the Northern Mariana Islands
 Saipan Sucks
 Pedro Agulto Tenorio

References

External links 

 The Insular Empire: America in the Mariana Islands, PBS documentary film & website
 Saipan Municipality, United States Census Bureau
 Department of the Interior, Office of Insular Affairs – Links to cultural and informational sites about the CNMI as well as to government sites

 
Islands of the Northern Mariana Islands
Capitals of country subdivisions in Oceania
Capitals of political divisions in the United States
Capitals in Oceania
Stratovolcanoes of the United States
Volcanoes of the Northern Mariana Islands
Former German colonies
Municipalities of the Northern Mariana Islands